Khvor Khvoreh Rural District may refer to:
 Khvor Khvoreh Rural District (Bijar County)
 Khvor Khvoreh Rural District (Saqqez County)